There are many diverse trails within Olympic National Park.  These trails traverse many different biomes, allowing hikers to explore from the coast of the Pacific Ocean to the summit of Mount Olympus.  The trails vary in length from less than a mile and a few minutes hike to many miles and multiple days.  The Pacific Northwest National Scenic Trail traverses the park from east to west, and has approximately 135 miles within its borders.  The trails are divided into five separate areas, Staircase/Dosewallips Trails, Hurricane/Elwha Trails, Quinault/ Queets Trails, Hoh/Bogachiel/Sol Duc Trails, and Coastal Routes.

Staircase/Dosewallips Trails

North Fork Skokomish River Trail 
Wagonwheel Lake Trail
Home Sweet Home Trail
Flapjack Lakes Trail
Upper Lena Lake Trail 
Gladys Divide Primitive Trail 
Black & White Lakes Primitive Trail
Smith Lake Primitive Trail 
Six Ridge Primitive Trail 
Putvin Primitive Trail 
Duckabush River Trail 
Lake Constance Trail 
West Fork Dosewallips River Trail 
LaCrosse Pass Trail
Anderson Moraine Trail 
Main Fork Dosewallips River Trail
Dosewallips River Trail
Constance Pass Trail 
Lost Pass Primitive Trail 
Gray Wolf Pass Trail

Hurricane Ridge/Elwha Trails

Royal Basin Trail 
Three Forks Trail 
Upper Gray Wolf River Trail 
Cedar Lake Way Trail 
Cameron Creek Trail
Grand Pass Trail 
Cameron Pass Trail
Cameron-Lost Pass Primitive Trail 
Deer Ridge Trail 
Badger Valley Trail 
Elk Mountain Primitive Trail 
Obstruction Point-Deer Park Trail 
PJ Lake Primitive Trail
Cox Valley Primitive Trail 
Lake Angeles Trail 
Heather Park Trail 
Switchback Trail 
Hurricane Klahhane Ridge Trail
Wolf Creek Trail
Little River Trail 
Elwha to Hurricane Hill Trail 
Heart O' The Forest Trail 
Griff Creek Trail 
Elwha River Trail 
Humes Ranch Loop
Lillian River Trail 
Hayden Pass Trail 
Dodger Point Primitive Trail 
Elwha Basin Way Trail 
Happy Hollow Trail 
Happy Lake Ridge Trail 
Olympic Hot Springs Trail 
Appleton Pass Trail 
Boulder Lake Trail 
West Elwha Trail 
Upper Lake Mills Trail Whiskey Bend Road to Lake Mills 
West Lake Mills Trail

Quinault/Queets Trails

Irely Lake Trail 
Big Creek Trail
Three Lakes Trail
Skyline Primitive Trail 
Elip Creek Trail
Martin's Park Primitive Trail 
North Fork Quinault River Trail 
East Fork Quinault River Trail 
O'Neil Pass Trail
Graves Creek Primitive Trail JCT 
Wynoochee Pass Trail 
South Fork Skokomish River Trail 
Queets River Trail

Hoh/Bogachiel/Sol Duc Trails

Mt. Storm King Trail 
Upper Barnes Creek Primitive Trail  
Aurora Divide Trail
Aurora Creek Trail 
Aurora Ridge Trail
Pyramid Peak Trail 
Spruce Railroad Trail

Coastal Routes

North Shi Shi Access Trail 
Shi Shi to Ozette River Beach Route 
Cape Alava to Ozette River Beach Route 
Cape Alava to Sand Point Beach Route
Sand Point Trail 
North Coast Beach Route 
 Erickson's Bay Primitive Trail 
 Second Beach Trail
 Third Beach Trail 
 South Coast Beach Route 
 Oil City Trail

References 
 National Park Service: Wilderness Trail Conditions

External links
National Park Service: Olympic National Park map
National Park Service: Olympic Wilderness Trail Guide